Ee Chin Li is a Malaysian politician. He has been the Member of Johor State Legislative Assembly for Tangkak since 2013.

Politics 
He was the Assistant treasurer of DAPSY Johor in 2011, Assistant Organising Secretary of DAPSY Johor in 2013, Treasurer of DAPSY Johor in 2015, Leader of DAPSY Johor in 2015, Treasurer of DAP Johor in 2018. He was also the Political Secretary for former Minister of Science, Technology and Innovation of Malaysia, Yeo Bee Yin from 2018 till the collapse of Pakatan Harapan government.

Election results

External links

References 

People from Johor
Democratic Action Party (Malaysia) politicians
Members of the Johor State Legislative Assembly
Malaysian politicians of Chinese descent
Living people
1982 births